Theodorakeio (before 1925: Τούδορτσι - Toudortsi) is a village in Pella regional unit, Macedonia, Greece.

Theodorakeio had 805 inhabitants in 1981. In fieldwork done by Riki Van Boeschoten in late 1993, Theodorakeio was populated by Slavophones. The Macedonian language was used by people of all ages, both in public and private settings, and as the main language for interpersonal relationships. Some elderly villagers had little knowledge of Greek.

References

Populated places in Pella (regional unit)